Jwala Ji (Pahari: जवाला जी) is a Hindu Goddess. Alternative spellings and names for Jwala Ji include Jawala Ji, Jwala Devi and Jwalamukhi Ji. The physical manifestation of Jwala Ji is always a set of eternal flames, and the term Jwala means flame in Sanskrit (cognates: proto-Indo-European guelh, English: glow, Lithuanian: zvilti) and Ji is an honorific used in the Indian subcontinent.

Jwalaji/jawalaji (flame) or Jwala Mukhi (a person with a face glowing like fire) is probably the most ancient temple discussed here besides Vaishno Devi. It is mentioned in the Mahabharata and other scriptures. There is a natural cave where eternal flames continue to burn. Some say there are nine flames out of the nine Durgas ... Several schools of Buddhism also share the symbolism of a seven-forked sacred flame.

The Legend
The legend is as follows: 

In ancient times when demons lorded over the Himalaya mountains and harassed the gods, Lord Vishnu led the gods to destroy the demons. They focused their strengths and huge flames rose from the ground. From that fire, a young girl was born. She is regarded as Adishakti -- the first 'Shakti.'

Known as Sati, the girl grew up in the house of Prajapati Daksha and later became the consort of Lord Shiva. When her father insulted Lord Shiva, she was unable to accept this and consequently killed herself. When Lord Shiva heard of his wife’s death his rage knew no bounds; and, holding Sati’s body, he began stalking the three worlds. The other gods trembled before his wrath and appealed to Lord Vishnu for help. Lord Vishnu released a sudarshan chakra which struck Sati’s body and broke it to pieces. At the places where the pieces fell, the fifty-one sacred 'shaktipeeths' came into being. "Sati’s tongue fell at Jawalaji (610 m) and the goddess is manifest as tiny flames that burn flawless blue through fissures in the age-old rock."

Centuries ago a cowherd found that one of his cows was always without milk. He followed the cow to find out the cause. He saw a girl coming out of the forest who drank the cow’s milk, and then disappeared in a flash of light. The cowherd went to the king and told him the story. The king was aware of the legend recounting that Sati’s tongue had fallen in this area. The king tried, without success, to find that sacred spot. Some years later, the cowherd went again to the king to report that he had seen a flame burning in the mountains. The king found the spot and had a darshan (vision) of the holy flame. He had a temple built there by Raja Bhumi Chand  and arranged for priests to engage in regular worship. It is believed that the Pandavas came later and renovated the temple. The folk song titled "Panjan Panjan Pandavan Tera Bhawan Banaya" bears testimony to this belief. 

Jawalamukhi has been a pilgrimage centre for many years. According to a legend, the Mughal Emperor came to this Jwala Mandir after the battle of Noorpur and Chamba Akbar. Akbar once tried to extinguish the flames by covering them with an iron disk and even channeled water to them.[5] But the flames overcame all these efforts. Akbar then destroyed the temple and had the priests and other devotees killed. After this, the king of Chamba (King Sansar Chand) reconstructed the temple. Maharaja Ranjit Singh installed a golden parasol (chhattra) and Sher Singh (the son of King Ranjit Singh) decorated the gates with silver. Thousands of pilgrims continue to visit the shrine year-round.

Map of Jwala Ji Temples

Jwala Ji of Kashmir
 

Jwalamukhi Temple is a Kashmiri Hindu mandir (temple) located in Khrew. On July 16, the Jwalamukhi Fair is hosted annually and is celebrated by both Hindus and Muslims (cf. Kashmiriyat).

Jwala Ji Kangra
The best-known Jwala Ji shrine is located in the town of Jawalamukhi, in the lower Himalayan area of the Kangra district, in the state of Himachal Pradesh, India. The shrine is about  kilometers from the larger town of Dharamshala. The temple style is typical of Jwala Ji shrines: four-cornered, with a small dome on the top and a square central pit of hollowed stone inside where the main flame burns continuously. A fair is held in the environs of the temple annually in July or August, during Navratras.

The temple had an associated library of ancient Hindu texts, many of which were translated from Sanskrit into Persian at the orders of Firuz Shah Tughlaq when the Delhi Sultanate overran the Kangra area.

According to legend, when Sati's body was divided into 51 parts, her tongue fell in the area of Jawalamukhi and it continues to be represented by the flames (or jyotis). Along with her tongue, the flames of Sati's yogic power also fell to the place. Some legends state that Sati's clothes also fell here; that when they fell they were on fire and the fire has never gone out. Near this area, eternal flames continue to burn in a natural cave. Some say there are seven or nine flames for the seven divine sisters or the nine Durgas. 

Besides Vaishno Devi, Jwalaji (flame) or Jwala Mukhi (flame mouth) is probably the most ancient temple mentioned by the Mahabharata and other scriptures.  

Maa JwalaMukhi is the family Goddess or Kuldevi of many hindus.

Dhyanu Bhagat or Bhakti Mein Shakti (1978), an Indian drama film, portrays the local legend of saint Dhyanu and his conflict with a Mughal emperor who is said to have visited this temple.

Jwala Devi of Shaktinagar 

Jwala Devi Temple is located in Shaktinagar township of Sonbhadra district, Uttar Pradesh. It is an ancient Ashtagrih temple of Jwala Devi and one of the 51 Shaktipeethas of India. The temple, believed to be 1000 years old, was constructed by Raja Udit Narayan Singh of Gaharwal. A new temple later replaced the old one. Here the tongue of Parvati is worshipped. The idol of the main deity is located in the Sanctum Sanatorium (central place of the temple). The old black stone idol which was in the old temple has been installed with other deities surrounding the main idol.

This Jwala Devi Temple is believed to have been blessed with the presence of Shakti due to the falling of the front tongue from the corpse of Sati Devi as Lord Shiva carried her and wandered throughout Āryāvarta in sorrow. It is believed that people offer gold/silver tongue as offerings here after their wishes are fulfilled.

Jwala Mai of Muktinath
The "eternal flame" at the Jwala Ji shrine in the village of Muktinath is located at an altitude of 3,710 meters at the foot of the Thorong La mountain pass in the Mustang district of Nepal. A small amount of natural gas is present in the Himalayan spring that emerges near the shrine, which gives the appearance of fire burning on the water itself. This shrine is usually called the Jwala Mai (Jwala Mother) temple, and is sacred to both Hindus and Buddhists.

Atashgah of Baku
The Baku Atashgah is a fire temple in Surakhani, a suburb of Baku in Azerbaijan. Historically, some Hindu pilgrims have referred to it as the Baku Jwala Ji. Given that fire is considered extremely sacred in both Hinduism and Zoroastrianism (as Agni and Atar respectively), and the two faiths share some elements (such as Yajna and Yasna) from a common proto-Indo-Iranian precursor religion, there has been debate on whether the Atashgah was originally a Hindu site or a Zoroastrian one.

Many scholars and officials have concluded that this is a Jwala temple for several reasons: the presence of several Hindu inscriptions in Sanskrit and Punjabi (as opposed to only one in Persian); encounters with dozens of Hindus at the shrine or en route in the regions between North India and Baku; and assessments of its Hindu-character by Parsi dasturs. In the early twentieth century, local claims were made to a visiting Parsi Dastur that the Russian czar Alexander III also witnessed Hindu fire prayer rituals at this location.

References

Shakti temples
Hindu temples in Himachal Pradesh
Hindu goddesses
Heavenly attendants in Jainism
Buildings and structures in Kangra district